Goalpokhar is a village in Goalpokhar I CD block in Islampur subdivision of Uttar Dinajpur district in the state of West Bengal, India.

Geography

Location
Goalpokhar is located at 

In the map alongside, all places marked on the map are linked in the full screen version.

Police station
Goalpokhar police station under West Bengal police has jurisdiction over Goalpokhar I CD Block and parts of Goalpokhar II CD Block. It is 76 km from the district headquarters and covers an area of 354 km2 40 km of the India-Bangladesh border is in the area covered by Goalpokhar PS.

CD block HQ
The headquarters of Goalpokhar I CD block is at Goalpokhar.

Demographics
As per the 2011 Census of India, Goalpokhar had a total population of 4,500, of which 2,392 (53%) were males and 2,108 (47%) were females. Population below 6 years was 873. The total number of literates in Goalpokhar was 1,522 (41.96% of the population over 6 years).

Official languages
As per the West Bengal Official Language (Amendment) Act, 2012, which came into force from December 2012, Urdu was given the status of official language in areas, such as subdivisions and blocks, having more than 10% Urdu speaking population. In Uttar Dinajpur district, Goalpokhar I and II blocks, Islampur block and Islampur municipality were identified as fulfilling the norms set. In 2014, Calcutta High Court, in an order, included Dalkhola municipality in the list.

Education
Ashraful Uloom Jr. High Madrasah School, established at Jainagaon, Goalpokhar in 1987, is a co-educational Urdu-medium unaided private school with arrangements for teaching from class VI to VIII. It has a play ground.

Healthcare
Lodhan rural hospital at PO Goalpokhar (with 30 beds) is the main medical facility in Goalpokhar I CD block.

References

Villages in Uttar Dinajpur district